Dzhulbars is a 1935 Soviet action film directed by Vladimir Schneiderov.

Plot 
The basmachi organize an attack on a peaceful caravan heading to mountain villages, and take prisoners the old guide Sho-Murad along with his granddaughter Peri. Border guards with sheepdog Julbars fight to save the captives.

Cast 
 Nikolay Cherkasov-Sergeyev as Sho-Murad (as N.P. Cherkasov)
 Natalya Gitserot as Peri (as Natasha Gitserot)
 Nikolai Makarenko as Tkachenko (as N.N. Makarenko)
 Ivan Bobrov as Abdullo (as I.V. Bobrov)
 Andrey Fayt as Kerim (as A.A. Fajt)
 N.P. Teleshov as Beggar

References

External links 

Dzhulbars at the on Encyclopedia of Russian Cinema

1935 films
1930s Russian-language films
Soviet black-and-white films
Soviet action films
1930s action films